Jai or JAI may refer to:

Abbreviations and codes
 Jaipur International Airport (IATA: JAI), in Jaipur, India
 Jamna Auto Industries, an Indian automotive parts company
 Java Advanced Imaging, an API for the Java platform
 Jet Airways (ICAO: JAI), an Indian airline
 Jewish Agency for Israel
 John Adams Institute for Accelerator Science
 Journal of Astronomical Instrumentation, a peer-reviewed academic journal by World Scientific

People
 Jason Rowe (born 1969), British pop/soul singer who recorded under the name Jai in the late 1990s
 Jai (actor) (born 1985), Indian Tamil film actor
 Jai Brooks, comedian from the Australian YouTube group, The Janoskians
 Jai Courtney (born 1986), Australian actor
 Jai Ingham (born 1993), Australian football player
 Jai Koutrae (born 1975), Australian actor
 Jai Lucas (born 1988), American basketball coach and former professional and collegiate basketball player
 Jai McDowall (born 1986), Scottish singer who won the fifth series of Britain's Got Talent
 Jai Rodriguez (born 1979), American actor and musician, known for the TV show Queer Eye for the Straight Guy
 Jai Taurima (born 1972), long jump champion of Australia
 Jai Waetford (born 1999),  Australian recording artist who came third on the fifth season of The X Factor Australia

Films
 Jai (2004 Tamil film), a 2004 Indian Tamil film starring Prashanth Thyagarajan
 Jai (2004 Telugu film), a 2004 Indian Telugu film starring Navdeep

Other uses
 JAI (programming language), a work-in-progress programming language developed by Jonathan Blow
 Jai, India, a village in Meerut District, India
 Jai Valley, a valley in Bhaderwah, Jammu and Kashmir, India
 Radio Jai, a Jewish radio station broadcasting from Buenos Aires, Argentina
 Jai, orphan boy sidekick to Tarzan in the 1966–1968 television series
 Jai, a shortened spelling of Luóhàn zhāi (Buddha's delight)

See also
 
 Chai (disambiguation)
 HAI (disambiguation)